Directorate may refer to:

Contemporary
Directorates of the Scottish Government
 Directorate-General, a type of specialised administrative body in the European Union
 Directorate-General for External Security, the French external intelligence agency 
 Directorate for Inter-Services Intelligence, the premier intelligence service of Pakistan and a division of Pakistan Army
 Directorate General of Civil Aviation (India), India's civil safety watch and responsible for investigation for aviation incidents
 General Intelligence Directorate (Jordan), the Jordanian state intelligence agency
 Intelligence Directorate, the Cuban state intelligence agency
 Veterinary Medicines Directorate, an agency of the Department for Environment, Food and Rural Affairs (United Kingdom)
 Military Intelligence Directorate (Israel), the Israeli Defence Force unit in charge upon collecting information in cooperation with the Mossad
 Unit, the Norwegian directorate for information and communications technology (ICT) and joint services in higher education and research which is part of the Ministry of Education and Research of Norway

Historical
 French Directory or Directorate, one of the French Revolution's governing bodies, 1795–1799
 Directorate of Ukraine, provisional revolutionary state committee of the Ukrainian National Republic, 1918–1920
 Directorate (Russia), the ruling body of the Russian Provisional Government, September–October 1917
 Directorate of Military Intelligence (United Kingdom), a department of the War Office (United Kingdom), disestablished 1964
 Immigration and Nationality Directorate, an agency of the Home Office (United Kingdom), disestablished 2007

See also 
 
 
 Directorio (disambiguation), Spanish for directorate
 Directorial system, for the term as used in comparative politics